Ninety Minute Stopover (German: Neunzig Minuten Aufenthalt) is a 1936 German adventure crime film directed by and starring Harry Piel. It also features Alexander Golling, Else von Möllendorff and Genia Nikolaieva. It was shot at the Grunewald Studios of Tobis Film in Berlin and On location in Lisbon. The film's sets were designed by the art directors Wilhelm Depenau and Karl Vollbrecht.

Synopsis
Berlin police officer Harry Winkler stops off in Lisbon before his ship sails to Buenos Aires where he is to take parting a boxing tournament. He joins forces with his friend from Scotland Yard Conny Steven to help a young woman whose relative appears to have vanished and been replaced by another man.

Cast
 Harry Piel as Harry Winkler
 Alexander Golling as 	Conny Steven
 Else von Möllendorff as 	Ilse Siebeck
 Elisabeth Eygk as Madeleine Ribail
 Genia Nikolaieva as 	Madame Clermont 
 Hans Zesch-Ballot	Alberto Basto
 Klaus Pohl as Ein Sekretär
 Eduard von Winterstein	Kriminalkommissar Winkler
 Hugo Werner-Kahle 		
 Ernst Albert Schaach
 Max Diekmann
 Paul Samson-Körner			
 Franz Kossak	
 Rolf Becker	
 Kurt Hinz	
Ruth Beyer
 Ingeborg Carlsson
Gustav Püttjer		
 Peter Erkelenz

References

Bibliography 
 Rentschler, Eric. The Ministry of Illusion: Nazi Cinema and Its Afterlife. Harvard University Press, 1996.

External links 
 

1936 films
Films of Nazi Germany
German adventure films
1930s adventure films
1930s German-language films
Films directed by Harry Piel
1930s German films
German crime films
1936 crime films
Films set in Lisbon
Films shot in Lisbon

de:90 Minuten Aufenthalt